Colchester United Football Club Under-23s are the under-23 team of Colchester United Football Club. They play in the South Division of the Professional U21 Development League 2, the second tier of reserve football in England. The team mostly consists of the club's under-23 players, although senior players have occasionally made appearances for the side, for instance, during recovery from injury. The team are coached by  Richard Hall.

Colchester United Football Club Academy are the youth team of Colchester United Football Club. They play in the South Division of the Professional U18 Development League 2, the second tier of youth football in England. The team are coached by Liam Bailey.

The under-23 team play their home games at either the Colchester Community Stadium or the club's training ground, Florence Park in Tiptree. The under-18's also use Florence Park for their home matches.

History
Under Colchester United chairman Robbie Cowling's stewardship, the club put forward a planning application for a nine-hectare site for a new training ground based in the nearby village of Tiptree in 2009. Planning permission was granted in 2010 for the centre which cost £3.5 million. It was built to house a new academy and provide training facilities for all teams within the club.

Under the new Elite Player Performance Plan development scheme, Colchester United were first granted Category Two status for their academy in July 2012. The new system allowed greater contact time between the young players within the academy and the club's coaching staff. However, in August 2013, the club fell short of the required standard set by the EPPP by three percent, but the club secured Category Two status once more in June 2014 after operating with an increased academy budget during the 2013–14 season. During the 2013–14 season, the Colchester United under-18 side secured a league and cup double by winning the Football League Youth Alliance South East division and the national Youth Alliance Cup.

Under-23 squad

Colchester United players who are eligible by age to play for the under-23 development squad (born on or after 1 January 1998).

Staff
Current coaching and medical staff within the academy.

Under 23s lead coach: Richard Hall
Under-18s lead coach: Liam Bailey
Under-18s assistant coach: Adam Lewis
Academy goalkeeping coach: Paul Smith
Academy sports science: Kem Ismail, James Lee
Academy physio: Greg Barnes

Academy graduates
The following players are graduates of the Colchester United Academy who have played for the Colchester United first-team since the academy's first year with Category Two status in July 2012.

Players who are still with the club are marked in italics.

 Macauley Bonne
 James Bransgrove
 Noah Chilvers
 Ryan Clampin
 Billy Cracknell
 Jack Curtis
 Louis Dunne
 Charley Edge
 Alex Gilbey
 Andre Hasanally
 Conor Hubble
 Tariq Issa
 Cameron James
 Frankie Kent
 Ollie Kensdale
 Freddie Ladapo
 Tom Lapslie
 Marley Marshall-Miranda
 Eoin McKeown
 Todd Miller
 Michael O'Donoghue
 Tosin Olufemi
 Dion Sembie-Ferris
 Harvey Sayer
 Dominic Smith
 Tom Stagg
 Sammie Szmodics
 Junior Tchamadeu
 Samson Tovide
 Kane Vincent-Young
 Diaz Wright
 Drey Wright

Honours
Football League Youth Alliance South East
Winners: 2013–14
Football League Youth Alliance Cup
Winners: 2013–14

References

Colchester United F.C.
Football academies in England